The 2000 Liga Perdana 2 season is the third season of Liga Perdana 2. A total of ten teams participated in the season.

Kedah was relegated from Liga Perdana 1 to join the Liga Perdana 2.

The season kicked off on 14 April 2000. Kelantan won the title and was promoted to Liga Perdana 1 alongside Malacca.

Teams

Ten teams competing in the third season of Liga Perdana 2.

 Kelantan (2000 Liga Perdana 2 champions)
 Malacca
 Kedah
 Kelantan JKR
 Kelantan TNB
 ATM
 Johor FC
 TMFC
 KL Malay Mail
 NS Chempaka

League table

1.Kelantan  - 36 PTS (2000 Liga Perdana 2 Champions)

2.Malacca  - 33 PTS (Promoted to Liga Perdana 1)

3.Kedah  - 30 PTS

4.Kelantan JKR  - 28 PTS

5.Kelantan TNB  - 23 PTS

6.ATM  - 22 PTS

7.Johor FC  - 21 PTS

8.TMFC  - 20 PTS

9.KL Malay Mail  - 17 PTS

10.NS Chempaka  - 13 PTS

Champions

References

Liga Perdana 2 seasons
1
Malaysia